Verticosta migrans is a species of small sea snail, a marine gastropod mollusk in the family Capulidae, the cap snails.

Distribution

Description 
The maximum recorded shell length is 10 mm.

Habitat 
Minimum recorded depth is 65 m. Maximum recorded depth is 366 m.

References

 Huang S.-I [Shih-I] & Lin M.-H. [Ming-Hui]. (2020). Verticosta n. gen. from Taiwan, Philippine, Gulf of Oman and North Atlantic Ocean (Gastropoda, Capulidae). Bulletin of Malacology, Taiwan. 43: 13–24.

External links
 Dall W. H. 1881. Reports on the results of dredging, under the supervision of Alexander Agassiz, in the Gulf of Mexico and in the Caribbean Sea (1877-78), by the United States Coast Survey Steamer "Blake", Lieutenant-Commander C.D. Sigsbee, U.S.N., and Commander J.R. Bartlett, U.S.N., commanding. XV. Preliminary report on the Mollusca. Bulletin of the Museum of Comparative Zoölogy at Harvard College, 9(2): 33-144

Capulidae
Gastropods described in 1881